The 1951 Alexander Cup was the Canadian national major ('open' to both amateur and professional leagues) senior ice hockey championship for the 1950–51 season.

League Champions

Western Canada Major Hockey League (WHL) - Saskatoon Quakers
Ontario Hockey Association (OHA) - Toronto St. Michael's Monarchs
Quebec Senior Hockey League (QSHL) - Valleyfield Braves
Maritime Major Hockey League (MMHL) - Charlottetown Islanders
Cape Breton Senior Hockey League (CBSHL) - Sydney Millionaires

Quarterfinals
Sydney Millionaires beat Charlottetown Islanders 4–2, 2 ties, on series.

Semifinals
Toronto St. Michaels Monarchs beat Saskatoon Quakers 4–0 on series.
Valleyfield Braves beat Sydney Millionaires 4–2 on series.

Final
Best of 7:
Valleyfield 4 Toronto 1
Toronto 4 Valleyfield 1
Toronto 4 Valleyfield 4
Toronto 6 Valleyfield 1
Valleyfield 7 Toronto 4
Valleyfield 4 Toronto 1

QSHL's Valleyfield Braves beat OHA's Toronto St Michaels Monarchs 9 points to 5.

External links
 Hockey Canada
 MMHL Seasons at hockeydb.com

Alex